The East Side Cadet Academy is a military high school in the Evergreen area of San Jose, California, United States.

See also
Santa Clara County high schools

External links 

East Side Union High School District
Military high schools in the United States
High schools in San Jose, California
Public high schools in California